= Jorn Bjorn Augestad =

Norwegian blogger and tourist

Jørn Bjørn Augestad
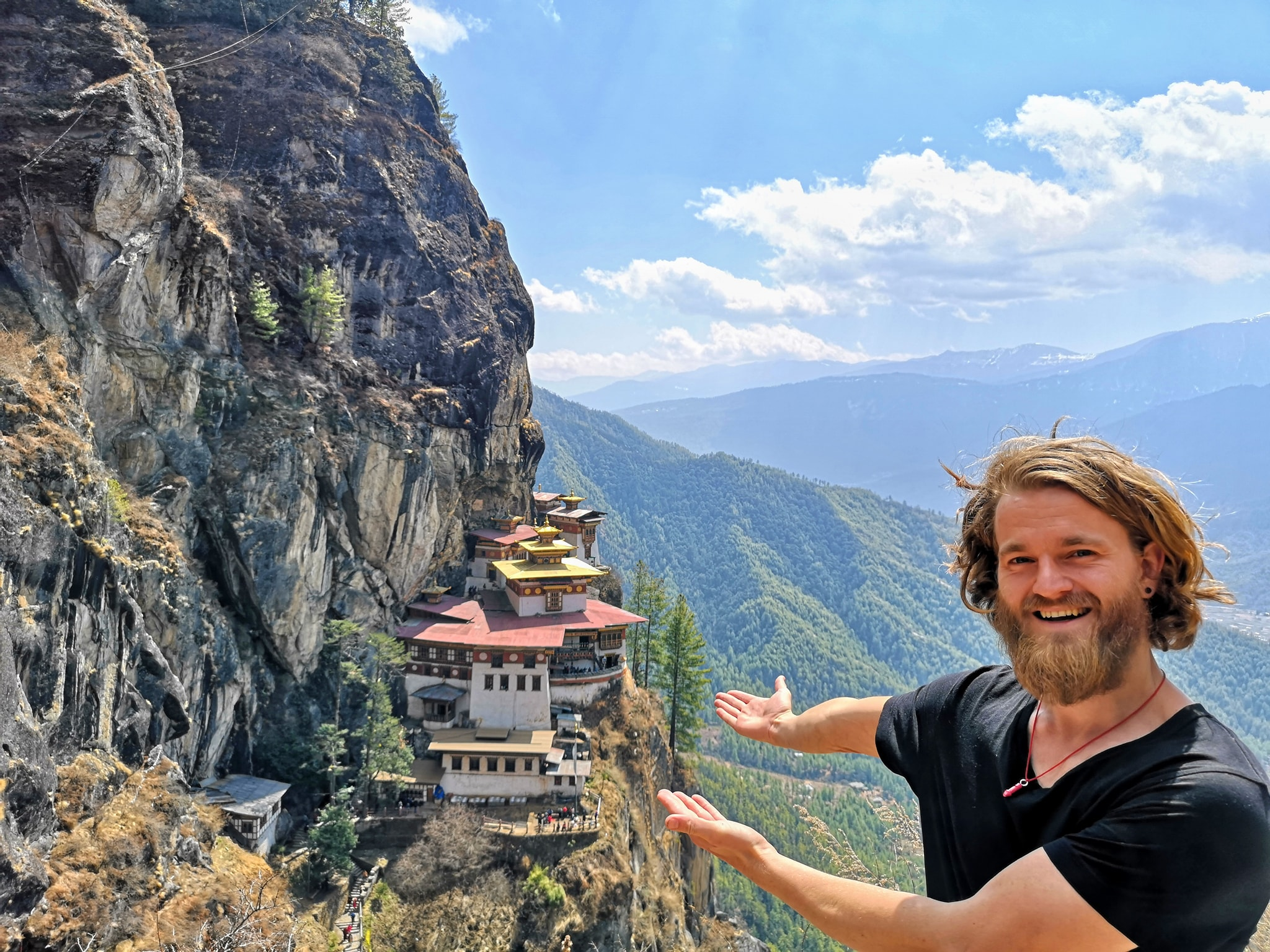
- Jorn Bjorn Augestad in Bhutan, his second last country to visit in the World
- Born: November 12, 1989 (age 36)
- Known for: Visiting all 201 nations in the world

Jorn Bjorn Augestad is a citizen of Norway whose travel plans triggered widespread comment.

Augestad runs a blog called "201 countries" documenting his efforts to visit every country in the world, before he turns thirty years old. Security experts have described his plans as naive and dangerous, because his plans will include war zones. Augestad, in turn, has described their warnings as exaggerated.

Augestad returned to visit his parents over Christmas in 2018. At that time he told Norwegian reporters he had just seven countries left to visit, before his birthday in March. Those seven countries were Equatorial Guinea, Sao Tome, Cape Verde, Nepal, Bhutan, Bangladesh and Seychelles.

March 13, 2019 he reached Seychelles, his final country and became then the youngest Norwegian to have visited every country in the World.

As a guest at the TV2 talkshow "God Morgen Norge" he explained that people are good in every country and that he wishes to keep on traveling.
